Bianka Lamade  (born 30 August 1982) is a former professional tennis player from Germany.

She turned professional in January 2000 at the age of 17. After just one year of playing on the tour, she had gone up to No. 127 in the world. As the world No. 534 in her main-draw debut, she upset world No. 26 Sabine Appelmans. In 2001, she won her first and only WTA Tour title at the Tashkent Open, where she defeated Seda Noorlander in the final. Her ranking rose to No. 59 with these results, which is her career-high ranking. She also reached two doubles finals, at 's-Hertogenbosch in 2002 and Luxembourg in 2001 with Magdalena Maleeva and Patty Schnyder.

She was a member of the German Fed Cup team in both 2001 and 2002. She played six matches in these ties, winning only one against Alicia Molik of Australia.

WTA career finals

Singles (1-0)

Doubles (0–2)

ITF finals

Singles (3–1)

Doubles (6–1)

External links
 
 
 

1982 births
Living people
German female tennis players
People from Leonberg
Sportspeople from Stuttgart (region)
Tennis people from Baden-Württemberg